Jack King (15 January 1879 – 25 June 1965) was an Australian rules footballer who was recruited from the Rutherglen Football Club and played with St Kilda in the Victorian Football League (VFL).

King played an incredible 26 years of senior football in the Ovens and Murray Football League, playing in 11 premierships with Rutherglen and was inducted into the O&MFL – Hall of Fame in 2008.

King would later become a Stawell Gift winning athletic coach in 1908 (His younger brother, Chris King), 1952 (Lance Mann) and 1954 (John Hayes).

King would later convince dual Stawell Gift winner (1966 & 67) Bill Howard to take up professional running in 1964.

King was inducted into the Stawell Gift – Hall of Fame.

King was the older brother of former South Melbourne and St. Kilda player, Jim King.

Notes

External links 

1879 births
1965 deaths
Australian rules footballers from Victoria (Australia)
St Kilda Football Club players
Rutherglen Football Club players